Kimchaek Municipal Stadium is a multi-use stadium in Kimchaek, North Korea.  It is currently used mostly for football matches and hosts the home matches of Wolmido Sports Club.  The stadium holds 30,000 people.

See also 
 List of football stadiums in North Korea

Football venues in North Korea
Sports venues in North Korea
Wolmido Sports Club
Buildings and structures in North Hamgyong Province